Richard Henry "Rick" Lehman (born July 20, 1948) is a former six-term member of the United States House of Representatives from California, serving from 1983 to 1995; he was previously a member of the California State Assembly.

Life and career
Lehman was born in Fresno, California. He grew up on his family's farm near Sanger and attended local public schools. He attended Fresno City College before transferring to the University of California at Santa Cruz from which he earned his degree. He was student body president at Fresno City College in 1968.  In that year he served as Fresno County Co-Chairman of Robert F. Kennedy's California presidential campaign and he was an alternate delegate to the Democratic National Convention in Chicago.

Political career 
In 1969 he joined the staff of California State Senator George Zenovich. In 1976, Lehman was elected to the State Assembly as a Democrat. He rose quickly through the ranks, becoming assistant majority leader by 1978. In 1983, he successfully ran for a seat in Congress, representing a newly created district in Fresno.  He was reelected six times.

Lehman was known in Congress for his passionate commitments to important causes such as environmental protection, water policy, and consumer protection. He was able to strike delicate balances on many of these issues, a particularly important skill given the increasingly conservative nature of his Central Valley district. His notable successes include playing instrumental roles in passage of laws to protect the Kings and Tuolumne Rivers, the California Desert Protection Act, creation of the Mono Basin National Forest Scenic Area and expansions of wilderness areas in the Sequoia and Yosemite National Parks.

He served on the Banking Finance and Urban Affairs Committee where he chaired the Consumer Affairs and Coinage sub-committee, the Energy and Commerce Committee and the Interior and Insular Affairs Committee where he chaired the Mining and Mineral Affairs subcommittee. He served 12 years on the water and Power subcommittee and received the distinguished service award from the National Water REsources Association in 1990. An avid outdoorsman, he frequented the Sierra back country and successfully climbed Mt. Kilimanjaro in Kenya in 1991.

Lehman's district was made considerably more Republican after the 1990s' round of redistricting.  It was renumbered the 19th District, and pushed further to the north and east, incorporating some more rural territory in the Sierra Nevada as well as the more conservative eastern portion of Fresno.  At the same time, he lost his share of Stockton to the new 11th District, and lost most of his Latino constituents to the neighboring 20th District.  Lehman barely held onto his seat in 1992, winning by only 1,100 votes.  This led to speculation that the 19th would not stay Democratic for long.  In 1994, Lehman was swept from office in the Republican Revolution, losing to Republican George Radanovich by a 17-point margin—one of the largest margins of defeat for an incumbent in that cycle.

After Congress 
Lehman is currently a partner for the Sacramento-based lobbying firm Lehman Levi Pappas & Sadler. He also serves as a member of the board of the National Parks Trusts, the Mono Lakes Committee, the National council for the Traditional Arts and is on the board of directors of Premier Valley Bank in Fresno.

External links

1948 births
Living people
Democratic Party members of the United States House of Representatives from California
Democratic Party members of the California State Assembly
American Lutherans
People from Fresno, California
Fresno City College alumni
Members of Congress who became lobbyists